Ammar Al-Daheem (born August 31, 1993) is a Saudi football player who plays for Al-Fateh as a defender .

References

External links 
 

1993 births
Living people
Saudi Arabian footballers
Saudi Arabia youth international footballers
Ettifaq FC players
Ittihad FC players
Hajer FC players
Al-Fateh SC players
Place of birth missing (living people)
Saudi Professional League players
Footballers at the 2014 Asian Games
Association football defenders
Asian Games competitors for Saudi Arabia
21st-century Saudi Arabian people
20th-century Saudi Arabian people